
Year 620 (DCXX) was a leap year starting on Tuesday (link will display the full calendar) of the Julian calendar. The denomination 620 for this year has been used since the early medieval period, when the Anno Domini calendar era became the prevalent method in Europe for naming years.

Events 
 By place 

 Byzantine Empire 
 Byzantine–Sassanid War: King Khosrau II captures Ancyra, an important Byzantine military base in central Anatolia. After the conquest of Egypt and Palestine, he restores the Persian Empire as it existed in 490 BC under Darius I. 
 The Slavs invade the area around Thessaloniki, which is unsuccessfully besieged. The city becomes a Byzantine enclave surrounded by Slavic territory. Urban life disappears and many towns in the Balkan Peninsula become villages.

 Britain 
 The Angles under King Edwin of Northumbria invade Rheged ("Old North") in Northern England, and expel King Llywarch Hen. He flees to Powys, and becomes a famous bard. Edwin's armies fight against Gododdin and Strathclyde.

 Asia
 King Pulakeshin II defeats the Harsha army on the banks of the Narmada River. Harsha loses a major part of his elephant force and retreats. A truce establishes Narmada as the northern boundary of the Chalukya Kingdom (India).

 America 
 The town of Cholula is founded in central Mexico (later said to be the oldest continuously occupied town in all of North America).

 By topic 

 Religion 
 Weltenburg Abbey in Bavaria (Germany) is founded by Benedictine monks.
 Isra and Mi'raj (Muhammad's ascension to heaven to meet God).

Births 
 Cedd, bishop of London (approximate date)

Deaths 
 Basolus, Frankish missionary (approximate date)
 Chuluo Khan, ruler of the Eastern Turkic Khaganate
 Dorotheus of Gaza, monk and abbot (approximate date)
 Eleutherius, Byzantine exarch of Ravenna 
 Imerius of Immertal, Swiss monk (approximate date)
 Khadija bint Khuwaylid, first wife of Muhammad
 Mirin, Irish monk and missionary (approximate date)
 Seanach Garbh, Irish abbot (approximate date)
 Shen Faxing, official of the Sui Dynasty
 Sisebut, king of the Visigoths (or 621)

References

Sources